Bill Vasey was a Democratic member of the Wyoming Senate, representing the 11th district since 1999.

External links
Wyoming State Legislature – Senator Bill Vasey official WY Senate website
Project Vote Smart – Senator Bill Vasey (WY) profile
Follow the Money – Bill Vasey
2006 2004 20021998 1992 1990 campaign contributions

Democratic Party Wyoming state senators
1939 births
Living people
People from Saratoga, Wyoming